Penicillium palmae is a fungus species of the genus Penicillium.

References

palmae
Fungi described in 1989